Below is a list of Hokkien dictionaries, also known as Minnan dictionaries or Taiwanese dictionaries, sorted by the date of the release of their first edition. The first two were prepared by foreign Christian missionaries and the third by the Empire of Japan, but the rest were prepared by ethnic Chinese scholars.

 A Dictionary of the Hok-këèn Dialect of the Chinese Language (1832) – Walter Henry Medhurst
 Chinese–English Dictionary of the Vernacular or Spoken Language of Amoy, with the Principal Variations of the Chang-chew and Chin-chew Dialects (1873) – Carstairs Douglas and Thomas Barclay
 Comprehensive Taiwanese–Japanese Dictionary (1931) –  for the Office of the Governor-General of Taiwan
 Practical English–Hokkien Dictionary (1950) – Chiang Ker Chiu
 A comprehensive dictionary of Taiwanese, with sections on the Zhangzhou and Quanzhou varieties of Southern Min (1991) – Chén Xiū and Chén Wénjīng
 Xiamen Fangyan Cidian (1993) – Zhou Changji
 Dictionary of Taiwanese Vocabulary (1995) – Yáng Qīngchù
 Minnan Fangyan Da Cidian (2006) – Zhou Changji et al.
 Dictionary of Frequently-Used Taiwan Minnan (online; β  2008; 1st  2011) – Ministry of Education (Taiwan)
 Longyan Fangyan Cidian  (2016) – Guo Qixi et al.

Further reading

Notes

References 

Dictionaries by language
Dictionaries
Lists of books